BCWest Air was a small airline based in Abbotsford, British Columbia, Canada. Its routes were from the mainland to Vancouver Island since September 2007, but ended in October 2008 due to unresolved shareholder dispute.

Routes
Routes flown were:

 Nanaimo - Abbotsford, British Columbia
 Abbotsford, British Columbia - Nanaimo
 Abbotsford, British Columbia - Victoria, British Columbia 
 Victoria, British Columbia - Abbotsford, British Columbia
 Victoria, British Columbia - Nanaimo
 Nanaimo - Victoria, British Columbia

Fleet
Fleet consisted of a Piper PA-31 Navajo and a Cessna 402.

See also 
 List of defunct airlines of Canada

Abbotsford, British Columbia
Airlines established in 2007
Airlines disestablished in 2008
Defunct airlines of Canada
Canadian companies established in 2007
2007 establishments in British Columbia